The 2014–15 Long Beach State 49ers men's basketball team represented California State University, Long Beach during the 2014–15 NCAA Division I men's basketball season. The 49ers were led by eighth year head coach Dan Monson and played their home games at Walter Pyramid. They were members of the Big West Conference. They finished the season 16–17, 10–6 in Big West play to finish in fourth place. They lost in the quarterfinals of the Big West tournament to Hawaii.

Roster

Schedule

|-
!colspan=9 style="background:#000000; color:#FFDF00;"| Regular season

|-
!colspan=9 style="background:#000000; color:#FFDF00;"| Big West tournament

References

Long Beach State Beach men's basketball seasons
Long Beach
Long Beach State 49ers men's basketball
Long Beach State 49ers men's basketball